USS Laffey may refer to:

 , a Benson-class destroyer lost during the Naval Battle of Guadalcanal, 1942
 , an Allen M. Sumner-class destroyer built in 1943; served at least into 1975

References

United States Navy ship names